On June 5, 2022, two people were killed and 14 others were injured in a mass shooting in Chattanooga, Tennessee. Another person was killed fleeing the shooting and two were injured by vehicles while fleeing.

Shooting
Responding officers arrived at around 2:42 am  at a reported shooting near a night club. They found multiple victims, immediately began first aid and secured the scene. Victims sustained injuries from gunfire and from fleeing the scene, with fourteen struck by gunfire and three struck by vehicles while attempting to flee. Three were confirmed dead, two by gunshots and one by being hit by a vehicle, with fourteen injured.

Investigation
Chattanooga Police Chief Celeste Murphy said there were multiple shooters. Officials believe the shooting was targeted and that it did not appear to be an active public safety threat related to the shooting.

On June 8, 2022, 28-year-old Garrian Dwayne King (born March 14, 1994) was arrested and charged with being a felon in possession of a firearm in connection with the shooting. According to the affidavit filed in U.S. District Court for Chattanooga, King was one of three men seen on security camera video exiting a stolen Chevrolet Suburban after 2 a.m. before the shooting. On June 13, 2022, 36-year-old Alexis Boynton Lewis was charged with criminal homicide, reckless endangerment, and possession of a firearm during the commission or attempt to commit a dangerous felony, and on June 14, 2022, 31-year-old Rodney Junior Harris Jr. was charged with possession of a firearm by a felon.

Response
Mayor Tim Kelly called on Congress to address gun violence. He said, "That doesn't mean taking guns away from responsible gun owners, but it does mean mandatory background checks and prohibiting high-capacity magazines."

See also
 2015 Chattanooga shootings
 Gun violence in the United States
 List of mass shootings in the United States in 2022

References

2020s crimes in Tennessee
2020s road incidents in North America
2022 in Tennessee
2022 mass shootings in the United States
2022 road incidents
21st century in Chattanooga, Tennessee
Deaths by firearm in Tennessee
June 2022 crimes in the United States
Mass shootings in Tennessee
Mass shootings in the United States